Events from the year 1898 in Russia.

Incumbents
 Monarch – Nicholas II

Events

 
 
 
 1st Congress of the Russian Social Democratic Labour Party
 25 April - Signing of Nishi–Rosen Agreement between the Russian Empire and the Empire of Japan concerning disputes over Korea.
 Central Committee compositions elected by the 1st–3rd congresses of the Russian Social Democratic Labour Party
 Founding of influential Mir iskusstva arts magazine.
 Russian Social Democratic Labour Party

Births

Deaths

References

1898 in Russia
Years of the 19th century in the Russian Empire